Ștefan Somogy (born 17 September 1929) is a Romanian rower. He competed in the men's eight event at the 1952 Summer Olympics.

References

External links
  

1929 births
Possibly living people
Romanian male rowers
Olympic rowers of Romania
Rowers at the 1952 Summer Olympics
Sportspeople from Arad, Romania